This is a list of Croatian television related events from 1972.

Events

Debuts

Television shows

Ending this year

Births
17 February - Bojana Gregorić, actress & TV host
2 March - Rene Bitorajac, actor & TV host

Deaths